Jake H. Josvanger (December 22, 1908 – June 30, 1966) was a former provincial and municipal level politician from Alberta, Canada. He served as a member of the Legislative Assembly of Alberta from 1955 to 1959 sitting with the Liberal caucus in opposition. He was also a municipal councilor for the Municipal District of Bonnyville No. 87.

Political career
Josvanger ran for a seat to the Legislative Assembly of Alberta in the provincial election as a candidate for the Liberals. He won the Bonnyville electoral district defeating two other candidates with just over 50% of the popular vote.

He was elected later that year as a municipal councilor for the Municipal District of Bonnyville No. 87 in the first election held after its creation in 1955. Josvanger would serve both political posts.

Josvanger ran for a second term in provincial office in the 1959 Alberta general election. He was defeated by Social Credit candidate Karl Nordstrom, finishing second in the three way race.

References

External links
Legislative Assembly of Alberta Members Listing

Alberta Liberal Party MLAs
Alberta municipal councillors
1966 deaths
1908 births
Place of death missing